SM U-32 or U-XXXII was a U-27 class U-boat or submarine for the Austro-Hungarian Navy. U-32, built by the Hungarian firm of Ganz Danubius at Fiume, was launched in May 1917 and commissioned in June.

She displaced nearly  when surfaced and over  when submerged. She was armed with two bow torpedo tubes and could carry a load of up to four torpedoes. She was also equipped with a  deck gun and a machine gun.

At Pola at war's end, the boat was handed over to Italy and scrapped in 1920.

Design and construction 

After these steps alleviated their most urgent needs, the Austro-Hungarian Navy selected the German Type UB II design for its newest submarines in mid 1915. The Germans were reluctant to allocate any of their wartime resources to Austro-Hungarian construction, but were willing to sell plans for up to six of the UB II boats to be constructed under license in Austria-Hungary. The Austro-Hungarian Navy agreed to the proposal and purchased the plans from AG Weser of Bremen.

U-32 displaced  surfaced and  submerged. She was capable of  while surfaced and  while submerged. U-27-class boats were designed for a crew of 23–24.

U-32 was armed with two  bow torpedo tubes and could carry a complement of four torpedoes. She was also equipped with a 75 mm/26 (3.0 in) deck gun and an  machine gun.

After intricate political negotiations to allocate production of the class between Austrian and Hungarian firms, U-27 was ordered from Ganz Danubius on 12 October 1915. She was laid down on 18 July 1916 at Fiume and launched on 11 May 1917.

Service career 
After launching, the U-boat made her way to Pola, where, on 29 April 1917, SM U-32 was commissioned into the Austro-Hungarian Navy under the command of Linienschiffleutnant Gaston Vio. Vio, a 30-year-old native of Fiume, was a first-time submarine commander. Vio and U-32 began their first patrol on 3 July when they sailed from Pola for a Mediterranean deployment. East of Manfredonia two days later, an enemy submarine launched a spread of three torpedoes at U-32 but the Austro-Hungarian submarine avoided them all. Two days later, U-32 had an at-sea rendezvous with the German U-boat . The following day, Vio failed to hit a steamer in the Gulf of Taranto.

On 15 July, U-32 launched torpedoes against the British steamer Incemore. Incemore was damaged but continued on her way; no one aboard the steamer was killed in the attack. The U-boat docked in Cattaro to end her first patrol four days later.

The next Mediterranean patrol for U-32 began on 14 August. Sister boat  met up with her at sea on 29 August. Two days later, U-32 stopped a Greek sailing vessel, Agios Georgios and examined her, but let her go on her way. Vio put in his boat at Cattaro on 4 September, ending the boat's second patrol. On 12 October, U-32 departed Cattaro for Durazzo, arriving the next day. On the 18th, the submarine departed there for Brindisi, screening for a sortie by the Austro-Hungarian cruiser  and a destroyer group. When U-32 reached Brindisi the following day, she was greeted by Italian torpedo boats which dropped five depth charges over her. After putting in at Cattaro on the 19th, she quickly departed for Pola to repair damage to her conning tower.

After two months of repairs at Pola, U-32 set out on 27 December but had to return with engine problems. She departed for the Mediterranean the following day and cruised between Alexandria and Malta, but returned to Cattaro in late January 1918 without success. Another patrol beginning in late February was similarly fruitless and U-32 returned to Cattaro empty-handed again on 26 March.

Kasseroller was a 31-year-old Salzburg native. On 8 May, U-32 began her first cruise with Kasseroller at the helm. Five days out, the Greek sailing ship Julia was stopped near Cape Matapan. After allowing Julias crew to board a lifeboat, Kasseroller sank Julia with fire from the U-boat's deck gun. After the 48 GRT ship was sunk, U-32 towed the lifeboat close to the shore. As a result, none of the Greek ship's crew died in the attack.

A week later, on 20 May, U-32 sank two more Greek sailing ships: the 58 GRT Agios Dionysios, and the 30 GRT Angeliki. The following day Kasseroller torpedoed a British steamer. Chatham, of 3,592 GRT , was headed from Karachi to Marseilles with grain and onions when U-32 sent her down  from Cape Matapan.

During the remainder of June and into July, U-32 patrolled in the Adriatic out of Cattaro, calling at the Albanian ports of Durazzo and San Giovanni di Medua. Continuing this same duty into August, U-32 was forced to crash dive to avoid an attack by another submarine on 19 August. Five days later an airplane attacked the U-boat, dropping a total of five bombs. After the attack, U-32 made her way to Cattaro and, in early September, headed back to Pola. After making a stop at Fiume, the submarine docked at Pola on 13 September and remained there through the end of the war. She was ceded to Italy as a war reparation, and scrapped in 1920. In total, U-32 sank four ships and damaged one other ship, hitting a combined total of 6,788 GRT.

Summary of raiding history

Notes

References

Bibliography 

 
 
 
 
 

U-27-class submarines (Austria-Hungary)
U-boats commissioned in 1917
1917 ships
World War I submarines of Austria-Hungary
Ships built in Fiume